Dominique Coene (born 23 January 1982) is a Belgian former professional tennis player.

Coene, who comes from Flanders, began competing in tennis at the age of eight and was the boys' doubles champion at the 2000 Wimbledon Championships (with Kristof Vliegen). He won Belgium's national championships in 2001 and 2003. On the professional tour he attained a best singles world ranking of 406, with two ITF Futures titles. After retiring from the tour in 2006 he played provincial league football with his local club FC Kleit Maldegem.

ITF Futures finals

Singles: 6 (2–4)

Doubles: 8 (5–3)

References

External links
 
 

1982 births
Living people
Belgian male tennis players
Wimbledon junior champions
Grand Slam (tennis) champions in boys' doubles
Sportspeople from East Flanders